Kota is a town and a nagar panchayat in Bilaspur district in the Indian state of Chhattisgarh.

Geography
It has an average elevation of 330 metres (1082 feet).

Demographics
 India census, Kota had a population of 15,020. Males constituted 51% of the population and females 49%. Kota had an average literacy rate of 66%: male literacy was 76% and female literacy was 55%. 16% of the local population was under 6 years of age.

References

Cities and towns in Bilaspur district, Chhattisgarh